Richland Township is a civil township of Montcalm County in the U.S. state of Michigan. The population was 2,868 at the 2000 census.

Communities 
 Vestaburg is an unincorporated community in the township at   The community was founded by George W. O'Donnell in 1874, who named it after his wife, Vesta Burgess O'Donnell. He recorded a plat in 1875 and became the first postmaster on September 14, 1875. The office closed on November 30, 1877, but re-opened on January 2, 1878. The Vestaburg post office, with ZIP code 48891, serves most of Richland Township, as well as a small portion of Home Township to the west, large parts of Ferris Township to the south and a small area in Day Township to the southwest.
 The community of Riverdale is to the east in Seville Township of Gratiot County and the Riverdale post office with ZIP 48877 also serves portions of eastern Richland Township.
 The village of Edmore is to the west in Home Township and the Edmore post office with ZIP code 48829 also serves a small area in southwest Richland Township.

Geography
According to the United States Census Bureau, the township has a total area of 36.3 square miles (93.9 km), of which 35.9 square miles (92.9 km) is land and 7.3 square mile (1.0 km) (1.05%) is water.

Demographics
As of the census of 2000, there were 2,868 people, 1,052 households, and 792 families residing in the township. The racial makeup of the township was 98.15% White, 0.24% African American, 0.42% Native American, 0.24% Asian, 0.14% from other races, and 0.80% from two or more races. Hispanic or Latino of any race were 1.81% of the population.

There were 1,052 households, out of which 37.1% had children under the age of 18 living with them, 60.6% were married couples living together, 9.0% had a female householder with no husband present, and 24.7% were non-families. 20.0% of all households were made up of individuals, and 8.2% had someone living alone who was 65 years of age or older.  The average household size was 2.71 and the average family size was 3.08.

In the township the population was spread out, with 29.0% under the age of 18, 7.0% from 18 to 24, 28.1% from 25 to 44, 24.4% from 45 to 64, and 11.5% who were 65 years of age or older.  The median age was 36 years. For every 100 females, there were 101.7 males.  For every 100 females age 18 and over, there were 98.9 males.

The median income for a household in the township was $34,847, and the median income for a family was $38,913. Males had a median income of $30,028 versus $20,871 for females. The per capita income for the township was $14,889.  About 6.5% of families and 10.5% of the population were below the poverty line, including 10.5% of those under age 18 and 14.5% of those age 65 or over.

References

Townships in Montcalm County, Michigan
Townships in Michigan